Waterstock House Training Centre (WHTC) is situated in the village of Waterstock in Oxfordshire, England. It is a well used venue for local and national equestrian training events and clinics.

It was once owned by Lars Sederholm and was a very well known training centre for horses and riders alike. Many of the royal family have ridden at WHTC and competitions are regularly held there.

Buildings and structures in Oxfordshire
Education in Oxfordshire